The 2016 Argentine Primera B Nacional was the 31st season of the Argentine second division. The season began in January and ended in July. Twenty-two teams competed in the league, sixteen returning from the 2015 season, two teams that were relegated from Primera División and four teams promoted from Federal A and B Metropolitana.

Competition format
The league's format has changed from last season. In this year there were twenty-two teams who played each other once in one Round-robin tournament. One team would be crowned as champion and automatically promoted to the Primera División. One team would be relegated at the end of the season.

Club information

League table

Results

Relegation
The bottom team of this table face relegation. Clubs with an indirect affiliation with Argentine Football Association are relegated to the Torneo Federal A, while clubs directly affiliated face relegation to Primera B Metropolitana.

Source: AFA

Season statistics

Top scorers

See also
 2016 Argentine Primera División
 2016 Torneo Federal A
 2015–16 Copa Argentina

References

External links
soccerway.com

Primera B Nacional seasons